Shorea cordifolia is a species of plant in the family Dipterocarpaceae. It is endemic to Sri Lanka.

Sources

cordifolia
Endemic flora of Sri Lanka
Trees of Sri Lanka
Critically endangered flora of Asia
Taxonomy articles created by Polbot